A writ in acceleration, commonly called a writ of acceleration, is a type of writ of summons that enabled the eldest son and heir apparent of a peer with more than one peerage to attend the British or Irish House of Lords, using one of his father's subsidiary titles, during his father's lifetime. This procedure could be used to bring younger men into the Lords and increase the number of capable members in a house that drew on a very small pool of talent (a few dozen families in its early centuries, a few hundred in its later centuries).

The procedure of writs of acceleration was introduced by King Edward IV in the mid 15th century. It was a fairly rare occurrence, and in over 400 years only 98 writs of acceleration were issued. The last such writ of acceleration was issued in 1992 to the Conservative politician and close political associate of John Major, Viscount Cranborne, the eldest son and heir apparent of the 6th Marquess of Salisbury. He was summoned as Baron Cecil, and not as Viscount Cranborne, the title he used by courtesy. The procedure of writs of acceleration has not been used in practice since the House of Lords Act 1999 removed the automatic right of hereditary peers to sit in the House of Lords.

Procedure

A writ of acceleration was granted only if the peerage being accelerated was a subsidiary one, and not the father’s highest, and if the beneficiary of the writ was the heir apparent of the actual holder of the peerages. The heir apparent was not always summoned in his courtesy title; rather, almost every person summoned to Parliament by virtue of a writ of acceleration was summoned in one of his father's baronies. For example, William Cavendish, Marquess of Hartington, heir apparent of William Cavendish, 3rd Duke of Devonshire, was summoned as Baron Cavendish of Hardwick. It was not possible for heirs apparent of peers in the Peerage of Scotland and Peerage of Ireland to be given writs of acceleration after 1707 and 1801, respectively, as holders of titles in these peerages were not automatically guaranteed a seat in the Westminster House of Lords.

An heir apparent receiving such a writ took precedence within the House of Lords according to the peerage accelerated. For example, when Viscount Cranborne was accelerated to the barony of Cecil (created in 1603), he took precedence ahead of all barons in Parliament created after that date.

If an accelerated baron died before his father, the barony passed to his heirs, if any, according to the remainder governing the creation of the barony, or else to his father. For example, Charles Boyle, Viscount Dungarvan, the eldest son of the 1st Earl of Burlington, was summoned to Parliament in 1689 in his father's barony of Clifford of Lanesborough. He predeceased his father, and his son, the Earl's grandson, was granted a writ of attendance to the Lords in the barony.

Acceleration could affect the numbering of holders of peerages.  In the example above, the 1st Earl of Burlington was also the 1st Baron Clifford of Lanesborough. His son Charles was, by virtue of the writ of acceleration, summoned to Parliament as Baron Clifford of Lanesborough, but predeceased his father. On the death of the 1st Earl of Burlington, Charles's son thus became the 2nd Earl of Burlington, but the 3rd Baron Clifford of Lanesborough (the accelerated barony had indeed passed to him on his father's death).

Notable examples
Several issues of writs of acceleration may be especially noted.

In 1628 James Stanley, Lord Strange, heir apparent of William Stanley, 6th Earl of Derby, was summoned to the House of Lords in the ancient Barony of Strange (created in 1299), a title assumed by his father. However, the House of Lords later decided that the sixth Earl's assumption of the Barony of Strange had been erroneous. Consequently, it was deemed that there were now two Baronies of Strange, the original one created in 1299 and the new one, created "accidentally" in 1628 (see Baron Strange for more information).

Another noteworthy writ of acceleration was issued in 1717 to Charles Paulet, Marquess of Winchester, heir apparent of Charles Paulet, 2nd Duke of Bolton. He was meant to be summoned in his father's junior title of Baron St John of Basing, but was mistakenly summoned as Baron Pawlett of Basing. This inadvertently created a new peerage. However, the Barony of Pawlett of Basing became extinct on his death, while the Dukedom was inherited by his younger brother, the fourth Duke.

The summons of Thomas Butler, 6th Earl of Ossory, to the English House of Lords in 1666, as Baron Butler, of Moore Park, may also represent an error for a writ of acceleration in his father's peerage of Baron Butler, of Lanthony (cr. 1660).

Alternatives
When it had been decided that the eldest son of a peer should become a member of the House of Lords, the alternative to a writ of acceleration was to create a completely new peerage. For example, in 1832 Edward Smith-Stanley, Lord Stanley, son and heir apparent of Edward Smith-Stanley, 12th Earl of Derby, was given a new peerage as Baron Stanley, of Bickerstaffe. Two years later he succeeded his father in the Earldom. This was in contrast to his son, Edward Smith-Stanley, 14th Earl of Derby, who in 1844 was summoned to the House of Lords through a writ of acceleration in the aforementioned title of Baron Stanley, of Bickerstaffe.

Other examples of new peerages being created for heirs apparent include the barony of Butler in the peerage of England, 1666, for Thomas Butler, 6th Earl of Ossory, eldest son of James Butler, 1st Duke of Ormonde, who sat in the English House of Lords by virtue of this title, although he had been accelerated to the Irish House of Lords as Earl of Ossory.

Similarly, after his career in the House of Commons was ended by a defeat in the October 1974 general election, Lord Balniel was given a life peerage as Baron Balniel, of Pitcorthie in the County of Fife, enabling him to sit in the House of Lords before succeeding his father, David Lindsay, 28th Earl of Crawford in 1975.

By contrast, after retiring from the House of Commons in 1992, George Younger, 4th Viscount Younger of Leckie was conferred a life peerage as Baron Younger of Prestwick, of Ayr in the District of Kyle and Carrick, there being no peerage held by his father other than the viscountcy. For reason both that his father was a baron and that he had no other peerages, John Wyndham, 1st Baron Egremont could not be sent to House of Lords by writ of acceleration, but was created Baron Egremont in 1964, by which title he continued to be known after succeeding as 6th Baron Leconfield in 1967.

Eldest sons of peers who had not received a writ of acceleration or a new peerage were eligible to stand for election to the House of Commons. It was far more common for eldest sons of peers to sit in the House of Commons than to receive a writ of acceleration or a new peerage. Before the 20th century, it was generally very easy for such men to find a constituency willing to elect them if they had any inclination for politics.

French peerage

In the peerage of the Ancien Régime of France, a similar procedure was possible: the resignation of peerage. Any lay peer—all of them dukes—could resign his peerage to his heir, thus allowing the heir to enjoy all privileges of peerage, such as presence in Parliament. The eldest peer was almost always granted a brevet allowing him to keep the honors and precedence of the resigned peerage. In many cases, the procedure of resignation was only used to grant heirs, often around the time of their wedding, new titles: as both men had now the honors of a duke but only one similarly named dukedom could exist at any time, one of the two took a new title (such as duc de Chaulnes and duc de Picquigny, or duc de Saint-Simon and duc de Ruffec). This procedure was different from the use of a courtesy title by the eldest son of a peer holding multiple dukedoms (such as the duc de Luynes, also duc de Chevreuse). From 1755, the royal authorization for these resignations was no longer granted; the king chose instead to grant brevets of precedence to the heirs rather than to their fathers after resignation. The first one of these brevet dukes was Louis-Léon de Brancas, eldest son of the Duke of Villars, brevetted Duke of Lauragais in 1755.

References

External links
Format for Writs in Acceleration and of Summons

Peerages in the United Kingdom